Alkemada is a village in Sri Lanka. It is located within Kandy District, Central Province. The village is a hamlet of Eladetta, and is inhabited by Moors.

Demographics

See also
List of towns in Central Province, Sri Lanka

External links

References

Populated places in Kandy District